Mario Cantone (born December 9, 1959) is an American comedian, writer, actor, and singer with numerous appearances on Comedy Central including Chappelle's Show. He also played Anthony Marentino in Sex and the City and Terri in Men In Trees (2006-2008). His style is fast-paced and energetic, with much of his humor coming from his impersonations of characters ranging from family members to celebrities to stereotypes.

Early life
Cantone was born in Massachusetts, and raised in Stoneham, where his Italian-American family moved when he was two. He was the fourth of five children of Mario Sr., a Boston restaurant owner, and his wife, Elizabeth (née Pescione). His father moved the family to Stoneham, according to Cantone in a 2004 New York Times interview to get her away from her bookie relatives. Cantone stated that the problem "was that she was not only a bookie but she was also a compulsive gambler." His mother, who had been a big band singer in her youth, died when he was 21.

As a child, Cantone would direct reenactments of shows. Cantone's first impression was of Julia Child, which he presented in a junior high school talent show. He graduated from Stoneham High School in 1978 and Emerson College in 1982. He befriended fellow comic Denis Leary at Emerson. He moved to New York City in 1983 and got a job as a chocolate vendor at Trump Tower.

Early career
While working at Trump Tower, he did impressions of people while selling chocolate truffles. He later worked as a jewelry salesman, quitting a year later to pursue comedy full time. He began his professional career hosting a children's show called Steampipe Alley, which aired on New York-New Jersey superstation WWOR-TV from 1987 to 1993.

Stand-up career
In his stand-up concerts, he is known for his occasionally campy impressions of entertainment personalities such as Liza Minnelli, Judy Garland, Bruce Springsteen, Jim Morrison, and Bette Davis as well as for his original songs.

Much of his comedy derives from his boisterous Italian-American family. Cantone, who is gay, has said that he considers himself an actor and comedian who happens to be gay rather than a gay comic relying on gay jokes. "Talking about being gay is a very small part of my show and when I first started I wasn't out on stage but I was out off stage, I certainly didn't lie about it on stage but if you didn't know you were an idiot and you lived in a cave after seeing me…really??"

Acting career

Sex and the City 
Cantone is known for his role in the HBO series      Sex and the City as Anthony Marentino, Charlotte York's gay wedding planner who dispensed advice with a rapid fire delivery.

Broadway 
Cantone made his Broadway debut in 1995, replacing Nathan Lane in the role of Buzz in Terrence McNally's Tony Award–winning play, Love! Valour! Compassion!  Later that year, he appeared in the revival of The Tempest with Patrick Stewart. Several years later, Cantone did a workshop for The Lion King as Timon but was not comfortable with the makeup or manipulating a puppet and eventually left the project. In 2002, he created and wrote his own one-man show for Broadway, An Evening With Mario Cantone. A year later, Cantone starred as Gidger in Richard Greenberg's The Violet Hour in a part written specifically for him.  The Violet Hour received mixed reviews and closed after 54 performances.

In 2004, Cantone appeared as Samuel Byck in Stephen Sondheim's musical Assassins.    Originally slated for the 2001 Broadway season, Assassins was postponed because of the September 11, 2001 attacks.  In 2001, Cantone had turned down the role of Carmen Ghia in Mel Brooks's The Producers. His other Broadway credits include his second one-man show, Laugh Whore, which ran from October 24, 2004, to January 2, 2005, at the Cort Theatre. Laugh Whore received a Tony Award nomination for Best Special Theatrical Event and an Outer Critics Circle award nomination for Outstanding Solo Performance. Showtime taped the December 11, 2004 performance, which premiered on May 28, 2005. It was the network's first Broadway production to air as a comedy special.

In September 2010, Cantone appeared in a staged reading of the Charles Messina play A Room of My Own at The Theatre at 45 Bleecker Street in Greenwich Village. As of November 2012, the play was still in development with Cantone in the cast. The Off-Broadway production is expected to begin previews in February 2016.

Other works
He started his career as the host of children’s show, “Steampipe Alley,” which aired in the late 80’s through 1993.

He has appeared in the Comedy Central roasts of Joan Rivers and fellow Boston-area native and Emerson College alumnus Denis Leary. The network's Chappelle's Show featured him in a segment called "Ask A Gay Dude."

His voice-over work includes Sunsilk "hairapy" advertisements. and the voice of talent scout Mikey Abromowitz in the 2007 computer animated movie Surf's Up. He has appeared frequently on the Opie and Anthony radio show.

He was a regular guest on the ABC daytime talk show The View since at least 2003 and became a guest co-host in 2005.  In August 2013, he was in the news as a rumored replacement for retiring co-host Joy Behar and since 2014 has been co-hosting more frequently.

Cantone was among the judges of the Miss America 2014 pageant. He has appeared several times on The $100,000 Pyramid and Match Game as a celebrity guest star.

In 2022, Cantone competed in season eight of The Masked Singer as "Maize". He was eliminated on "Andrew Lloyd Webber Night" alongside Gloria Gaynor as "Mermaid".

Personal life
In October 2011, Cantone married his partner of 20 years, musical theater director Jerry Dixon. The ceremony was officiated by pastor Jay Bakker.

Filmography

Film

Television

References

External links
 
 
 

1959 births
Living people
Male actors from Boston
American male film actors
American people of Italian descent
American stand-up comedians
American male television actors
Emerson College alumni
American gay actors
Gay comedians
LGBT people from Massachusetts
20th-century American LGBT people
21st-century American LGBT people
20th-century American comedians
21st-century American comedians
American LGBT comedians